Paulina Gaitán Ruíz (born February 19, 1992) is a Mexican actress. She is best known throughout Mexican television and movies. She is more recently known for her role in the popular Netflix series, Narcos, as the devoted young wife of Colombian drug kingpin Pablo Escobar.

Biography
Paulina Gaitán was born in Mexico City.  Gaitán started acting at age 9 and at the age of 12 had an important role in Mexican director Luis Mandoki's Innocent Voices, a tale about the civil war in El Salvador. 

She was the female lead in the Cary Joji Fukunaga film Sin Nombre, where she played the character of Sayra, who joins her father and uncle when they try to migrate from Honduras to the United States, and ends up travelling with El Casper, a gang member, played by actor Edgar Flores.

Gaitán also played a girl kidnapped by sex traffickers in the 2007 movie Trade alongside Kevin Kline. She portrayed Sabina, a lead role in the Mexican horror drama We Are What We Are (Somos Lo Que Hay) in 2010. In addition, she has played the role of Zuvely in the short film En Tus Manos, which was also released in 2010. 

In 2012, Gaitán starred in the ensemble cast of the ABC Steven Spielberg series The River. Since 2015, she has starred in the Netflix original series Narcos as Tata, the wife of narcoterrorist Pablo Escobar. In 2018, she began starring as Violetta, the female lead in the Amazon Prime Original Series Diablo Guardián.

Filmography

Films

Television

References

External links
 

1992 births
Actresses from Mexico City
Living people
Mexican child actresses
Mexican film actresses
Mexican television actresses